Tucker Kraft (born November 3, 2000) is an American football tight end for the South Dakota State Jackrabbits.

Early years
Kraft was born on November 3, 2000, in Timber Lake, South Dakota. He later attended Timber Lake High School, where he played running back, middle linebacker, and punter on the football team. As a senior, Kraft rushed for 1,405 yards and 24 touchdowns and was named first team All-State. He committed to play college football at South Dakota State over a late offer from Wyoming.

College career
Kraft redshirted his true freshman season. He caught seven passes for 90 yards during the spring 2021 season, which was delayed from the fall due to the COVID-19 pandemic. As a redshirt sophomore, Kraft started all 15 of South Dakota State's games and had 65 receptions for 780 yards and six touchdowns. He was named consensus FCS All-American and All-Missouri Valley Football Conference (MVFC).

References

External links
South Dakota State Jackrabbits bio

2000 births
Living people
American football tight ends
South Dakota State Jackrabbits football players
Players of American football from South Dakota